The KFCF (88.1 FM) is an American radio station broadcasting a community radio format. Licensed to Fresno, California, the station is currently owned by the Fresno Free College Foundation.  KFCF gets over 85% of its programming from KPFA in Berkeley.

History
The KFCF began broadcasting on June 9, 1975, and was patterned after KPFA and Pacifica Radio's mission of being listener-sponsored and not influenced by corporate advertisers or government funding. It was designed to be the educational electronic media in the Valley, devoted to alternative programming with a strong commitment to peace and justice.

The KFCF became a project of the Fresno Free College Foundation in 1972. At that time, Alex Vavoulis was its president. Other Board members were Douglas C. Broten, Les Kimber, Blanche Nosworthy, William T. Richert, James M. Smith and Al Villa. Since 1975, the station has played an important role in the local broadcasting scene. Through the programming originating at Pacifica Radio station KPFA, Valley people could hear about major historical events (i.e. the crisis in Haiti), poetry and prose of creative writers, music from classical to avant-garde. Some 15 to 20 percent of KFCF's programming originates in the Valley, and it features and includes public affairs issues such as agriculture, water resources, air quality, civil liberties, war and peace, ethnic diversity, race relations, education, labor and science, and music. All of these programs are made possible by dedicated volunteers and by committed subscribers, who pay the cost of operating the radio station.

See also
 List of community radio stations in the United States

References

External links

 

Pacifica Foundation stations
FCF
FCF
Radio stations established in 1975
Community radio stations in the United States